The 2013 Nebelhorn Trophy was held on September 26–28, 2013 at the Eislaufzentrum Oberstdorf. It is held annually in Oberstdorf, Germany and is named after the Nebelhorn, a nearby mountain. Medals were awarded in men's and ladies' singles, pair skating, and ice dance. Nebelhorn was the last qualifying event for the 2014 Winter Olympics.

Overview
Though most Olympic spots were earned at the 2013 World Championships, six spots in each of men's and ladies' singles, four in pair skating, and five in ice dance were available at Nebelhorn for countries which remained without a berth in a discipline. Skaters from previously qualified countries also competed but only for medals; Nebelhorn could not be used to earn additional spots if a country already had one in a discipline.

Russia's Tatiana Volosozhar / Maxim Trankov won the pairs' event after placing first in both programs, while Germany's Maylin Wende / Daniel Wende and Mari Vartmann / Aaron Van Cleave took silver and bronze respectively. Great Britain's Stacey Kemp / David King, Ukraine's Elizaveta Usmantseva / Roman Talan, Estonia's Natalja Zabijako / Alexandr Zaboev, and Israel's Andrea Davidovich / Evgeni Krasnopolski earned Olympic berths for their countries.

The ladies' event was won by Russia's Elena Radionova, with silver going to Japan's Miki Ando and bronze to the United States' Ashley Cain. The Olympic berths were earned by Brooklee Han for Australia, Elene Gedevanishvili for Georgia, Anne Line Gjersem for Norway, Kerstin Frank for Austria, Elizaveta Ukolova for the Czech Republic, and Isadora Williams for Brazil.

Japan's Nobunari Oda won the men's event for the third time, finishing over 30 points ahead of silver medalist Jason Brown of the United States and bronze medalist Jeremy Ten of Canada. Securing an Olympic spot for their country were Alexei Bychenko for Israel, Zoltán Kelemen for Romania, Michael Christian Martinez for the Philippines, Brendan Kerry for Australia, Yakov Godorozha for Ukraine, and Paul Bonifacio Parkinson for Italy.

Madison Hubbell / Zachary Donohue of the United States were the winners of the ice dance event ahead of Russia's Ksenia Monko / Kirill Khaliavin and Canada's Alexandra Paul / Mitchell Islam. China's Huang Xintong / Zheng Xun, Turkey's Alisa Agafonova / Alper Uçar, Australia's Danielle O'Brien / Gregory Merriman, Japan's Cathy Reed / Chris Reed, and Spain's Sara Hurtado / Adrià Díaz earned Olympic spots for their countries.

Entries

Results

Men

Ladies

Pairs

Ice dance

References

External links

 Entries at the International Skating Union
 2013 Nebelhorn Trophy results
 2013 Nebelhorn Trophy at Deutsche Eislauf-Union

Nebelhorn Trophy
Nebelhorn
Nebelhorn Trophy